Yeseida Isaid Carrillo Torres (born 22 October 1993) is a Colombian race walker. She competed in the women's 20 kilometres walk event at the 2016 Summer Olympics.

References

External links
 
 

1993 births
Living people
Colombian female racewalkers
Athletes (track and field) at the 2016 Summer Olympics
Olympic athletes of Colombia
People from Cundinamarca Department
21st-century Colombian women